Baharestan (also Romanized as Bahārestān and Bahristān) is a city in the Central District of Isfahan County, Isfahan Province, Iran. At the 2006 census, its population was 45,538, in 12,769 families.

Baharestan is a new planned city situated 20 km southeast of Isfahan and north of Lashtar mountains along Isfahan-Shiraz Road.

References

External links

Project page on Naqsh-e-Jahan Pars Consulting Engineers website.
Baharestan New Town Residential Complex project investment factsheet,  Iranian Urban Development and Revitalization Organization (UDRO).
Comprehensive portal of Baharestan new city classified ads

Populated places in Isfahan County
Cities in Isfahan Province
Planned cities in Iran